The epithet the Magnanimous may refer to:

Albert II of Germany (1397-1439), King of Hungary, Bohemia, and Germany
Alfonso V of Aragon (1396-1458), King of Aragon, Valencia, Majorca, Sardinia and Corsica, Sicily, and Naples
Charles II, Count of Alençon (1297-1346)
John V of Portugal (1689-1750), King of Portugal and the Algarves
John Frederick I, Elector of Saxony (1503-1554), head of the Protestant Schmalkaldic League
Ladislaus of Naples (1377-1414), King of Naples
Maurice de Berkeley, 2nd Baron Berkeley (1271-1326)
Otto V, Duke of Brunswick-Lüneburg (1439-1471), also  Prince of Lüneburg
Pedro II of Brazil (1825-1891), Emperor of Brazil
Philip I, Landgrave of Hesse (1504-1567), a leading champion of the Protestant Reformation

See also
List of people known as the Generous

Lists of people by epithet